Enea Jaupi (born 6 October 1993) is an Albanian-Sanmarinese professional footballer who plays for Sanmarinese club Fiorentino. He also represented San Marino B at 2017 UEFA Regions' Cup.

Club career
Jaupi made his professional debut with Fiorentino on 1 February 2014 in team's 2–1 home defeat to Cosmos. He scored his first goal later in his third league appearance, netting his team's third goal in an eventual 3–3 home draw versus Juvenes/Dogana. On 13 April, in the matchday 22 against Virtus, Jaupi scored the lone goal go give his team three important points for the European spot. He finished his first season with Fiorentino by playing 10 matches, all of them as starter, scoring five times in the process.

International career
Despite being Albanian, in June 2016, Jaupi was called by the San Marino B team to participate in 2017 UEFA Regions' Cup. San Marino B was placed in the Group B of the preliminary round. He played his first match on 3 June against South Wales, scoring a brace to lead the team into a 4–0 win. In the second match against ZSMK, Jaupi scored an early opener in the 7th minute in an eventual 3–0 win to secure his side a spot in the intermediate round. In the last match against Xanthi F.C., Jaupi scored the equalizer in a 1–1 draw, as San Marino ended the Group B with 7 points while Jaupi finishing the group with 4 goals in 3 games.

In October 2016 Jaupi rejoined with San Marino B who was placed in Group 2 of intermediate round. He continued with his solid performances with San Marino B by scoring the winner in the first match against Tuzla Canton on 27 October. Two days later, Jaupi scored the lone goal of his team in a 5–1 devastating defeat to South-West Region, taking his tally up to 6 goals. San Marino B finished the group with six points tied with Castile and León and South-West Region, but missed out first place due to goal difference. Jaupi finished the competition by making 6 matches, scoring 6 goals and providing 1 assist.

References

External links
Enea Jaupi – UEFA competition record

1993 births
Living people
People from Gramsh, Elbasan
Albanian footballers
Association football forwards
F.C. Fiorentino players
F.C. Domagnano players
Albanian expatriate footballers
Expatriate footballers in San Marino